Panthiades bathildis is a butterfly in the family Lycaenidae. It was described by Cajetan and Rudolf Felder in 1865. It is found from Mexico, Central America and Panama to Colombia, Venezuela and Suriname. There have also been sightings in Texas.

References

Butterflies described in 1865
Eumaeini
Lycaenidae of South America
Butterflies of Central America
Butterflies of North America
Taxa named by Baron Cajetan von Felder
Taxa named by Rudolf Felder